The 1997 Indian Federation Cup, also known as 1997 Kalyani Black Label Federation Cup due to sponsorship reasons, was the 20th season of the Indian Federation Cup. The tournament was held between 14 June and 20 July 1997. It was won by Salgaocar, who beat defending champions East Bengal 2–1 in the final. Salgaocar's captain Bruno Coutinho was named player of the tournament.

Pre-quarterfinals

Quarter-finals

Semi-finals

Third place play-off

Final

References

External links
 1997–98 Federation Cup at Rec.Sport.Soccer Statistics Foundation
 1997–98 Federation Cup at indianfootball.de

Indian Federation Cup seasons
1997–98 domestic association football cups
1997–98 in Indian football